In Haitian vodou, simbi is a large and diverse family of serpent loa, or gods. It almost always refers to something related to the vodou religion, but may also refer to:

People
 Simbi Ajikawo, English rapper, singer and actor who performs as Little Simz
 Patou Ebunga-Simbi, Congolese footballer
 Simbi Khali, American actress and singer-songwriter
 Simbi Mubako, Zimbabwean ambassador
 David Simbi, Zimbabwean engineer

Other uses
 Simbi (band), a mizik rasin, or vodou roots, band from Göteborg, Sweden
 Simbi, Mali, a town and commune
 Sometimes I Might Be Introvert, a 2021 album by Little Simz